ClubDJPro (often referred to as ClubDJ) is a DJ console and video mixing tool developed by Cube Software Solutions Inc. software. It was released in June 2005.

User interface
ClubDJPro has a GUI that was designed to allow aesthetic revisions via Skins. The skin engine that ClubDJPro uses allows for the ability to expand the software to take up the entire screen.

As of 4.4.3.3 there are 3 user changeable skins included in the program which are changeable in the preferences tab. They are called 'AquaLung', 'Eleanor', and 'Grabber'.

Editions
ClubDJPro is available in two different editions, with separate features depending upon their target consumer group.
 DJ Edition - Can play audio files only.
 VJ Edition - Contains all of the features of the DJ Edition, in addition to support for video, karaoke, and visualizations.

Supported MIDI Controllers
Supported since version 2.0:
 Hercules Console
 Hercules Console MK2
 Hercules Control MP3
 PCDJ DAC-2 Controller

Version History
The initial "final release" of ClubDJPro was released on June 24, 2005.

On June 26, 2009, the 4th iteration of the ClubDJPro software was released.

The development of the software and website appears to have halted. As of March 2018 the website continues to show a new version "Coming Spring 2016".

References

External links 
Official website
Company website (web design edmonton)

Audio mixing software
Video editing software
Windows multimedia software
2005 in computing